A referendum on union with the Northern Mariana Islands was held in Guam on 4 November 1969. The proposal was rejected by 58% of voters due to fears about an increase in taxation. Despite the result, a similar referendum was held in the Northern Mariana Islands on 9 November in which 61% of voters supported union with Guam.

Results
Should all of the islands of the Marianas be politically reintegrated within the framework of the American territory of Guam, such new territory to be known as the Territory of the Marianas?

References 

Guam
1969 in Guam
Referendums in Guam
Administrative division referendums
Sovereignty referendums
Border polls